Don Oakley (born 1927)  is an American author. He has also been an editorial writer for Scripps Howard News Service and for Newspaper Enterprise Association.

Published works
 Two Muskets for Washington (1970, ISBN B0006C5BU6)
 The Creston Creeper (1988)
 The Adventure of Christian Fast (1989)
 Slow Burn (1999)
 Aviatrix (2002)

References 

1927 births
Possibly living people
20th-century American novelists
21st-century American novelists
American male novelists
American print editors
20th-century American male writers
21st-century American male writers